Gavan Kola (also Romanized as Gāvān Kolā and Gāvān Kalā) is a village in Babol Kenar Rural District, Babol Kenar District, Babol County, Mazandaran Province, Iran. At the 2006 census, its population was 1,311, in 357 families.

References 

Populated places in Babol County